Bert is a yellow Muppet character on the long running PBS and HBO children's television show Sesame Street. Bert was originally performed by Frank Oz.

Since 1999, Muppeteer Eric Jacobson has been phased in as Bert's primary performer. Bert has also made cameo appearances within The Muppets franchise, including The Muppet Show, its second pilot episode The Muppet Show: Sex and Violence, The Muppet Movie, and The Muppets Take Manhattan, in addition to an appearance with Ernie on The Flip Wilson Show on September 14, 1972, on which he sang "Clink, Clank", a song about noises. Jacobson joined Sesame Street in 1994.

Bert's age has never been defined, but performer on Sesame Street Live, Taylor Morgan, has said that "I just kind of try to think like a six year old or a seven year old, because that's how old Bert is." He and his roommate Ernie form a comic duo that is one of the program's centerpieces, with Bert acting as the world weary foil, to Ernie's naive troublemaking.

Discography
As the duo often sing in their skits, several albums were released, containing studio recorded versions of their songs. Bert's best known song is "Doin' the Pigeon". He and Ernie both had their own video, The Best of Ernie and Bert, and their own album, Bert and Ernie's Greatest Hits. Only Ernie, however, has hit the U.S. Billboard Hot 100 with his song "Rubber Duckie", in September 1970.

See also
Bert and Ernie
Bert is Evil
Ernie

References

Sesame Street Muppet characters
Television characters introduced in 1969
Television sidekicks